The Chicago Bliss were a women's American football team based in the Chicago area. The Bliss were one for the first four teams to participate in the Lingerie Bowl and were carried over to the formation of the Lingerie Football League (LFL) in 2009. After the formation of the league, the Bliss played at multiple indoor and outdoor venues. In 2013, the league rebranded as the Legends Football League. The Bliss were the LFL team with the most wins and the most championship titles. At of the conclusion of the 2019 season, the Bliss had a league-best 40–14–1 all-time record and four Legends Cup wins.

Following the 2019 season, the LFL ceased operations and relaunched as the Extreme Football League (X League), which first played in 2022. All former LFL teams received new brands and the Bliss were replaced by the Chicago Blitz.

History
The Chicago Bliss is one of four teams that were introduced in 2004 for the inaugural Lingerie Bowl along with the Dallas Desire, Los Angeles Temptation, and New York Euphoria. The Bliss were defeated by New York Euphoria in the 2005 Eastern Final (where one of the Semi-Finals included a Skill Test, a 3-on-2 match, and a dance competition) at Lingerie Bowl II and then were defeated again by New York in the 2006 Eastern Final at Lingerie Bowl III. Lingerie Bowls IV, V, and VI were then all cancelled for various reasons.

In 2009, the Lingerie Football League (LFL) was launched with multiple games in a season instead of just an annual event. On September 4, 2009, the Chicago Bliss defeated the Miami Caliente 29–19 in the first ever game of the LFL at the Sears Centre Arena in Hoffman Estates, Illinois. In 2009 the coaching staff consisted of Bliss Head Coach Keith Hac, coach of the Indoor Football League's Chicago Slaughter.; Offensive Coordinator Rasche Hill, a former member of the National Football League Jacksonville Jaguars and the Chicago Slaughter; and Defensive Coordinator DeJuan Alfonzo, a former member of the Chicago Rush and Chicago Slaughter. The Bliss defeated the Miami Caliente 20–7 to win the Eastern Conference title but fell 27–14 to the Los Angeles Temptation in Lingerie Bowl VII. Professional wrestler Danielle Moinet also played with Chicago Bliss from 2008 through 2011, where she was cornerback and team captain.

Keith Hac coached Chicago for nine seasons with a 29-6-1 regular season record.  Under Hac, Chicago qualified for the playoffs eight times, reached the Legends Cup six times (2009, 2013, 2014, 2015, 2016, and 2018), and won the championship four times (2013, 2014, 2016, and 2018).  His overall record was 40-10-1 making him the winningest coach in the league's history and the only coach (as of 2022) to win 40 games.

Sidney Lewis became head coach in 2019 and in two seasons has gone 2-4 in the regular season, qualifying for the playoffs in 2022.

In 2013, the Lingerie Football league was rebranded as the Legends Football League and shifted to a summer and fall season schedule. On September 1, 2013, the Bliss then won their first championship, now called the Legends Cup, over the Philadelphia Passion. They would repeat as champions the next year, appear in four consecutive championships including a third title, and win a fourth title in 2018. The Bliss had since used both Sears Centre Arena and Toyota Park in Bridgeview, Illinois, in various seasons as their home venue.

Seasons

2009–10 schedule

2010–11 schedule

2011–12 schedule

2013 schedule

2014 schedule

2015 schedule

2016 schedule

2017 schedule

2018 schedule

2019 schedule

References

External links
 
 
 
 

Legends Football League US teams
Bliss
American football teams established in 2004
2004 establishments in Illinois
Women's sports in Illinois
Women in Chicago